The Girls Home Internationals was an amateur team golf championship for girls between the four Home Nations. Ireland was represented by the whole island of Ireland.The event was organised by The R&A. The inaugural event was held in 1969 and the venue cycled between the four nations. The winning team received the Stroyan Cup. Originally it was played immediately before, and at the same venue, as the Girls Amateur Championship. However it was later held as a separate event. In 2021 the match was replaced by a combined Girls and Boys Home Internationals.

A match between Scotland and England girls had been played since 1935 while Ireland and Wales had also played earlier matches.

Format
In its final format, the championship was played over three days with the four teams competing against each other in individual matches. A match consists of three foursomes and six singles each over 18 holes. The scores were calculated by team results with each team scoring one point for a team win and half a point for a halved match. Ties were resolved by the number of individual matches won. Each team had 7 players, although up to 2015 there were teams of 8.

History
From 1969 to 1975 the event was played on the Monday and Tuesday before the Girls Amateur Championship, with matches consisting of 7 singles matches over 18 holes. Two matches were played on the Monday and one on the Tuesday. From 1976 to 1978 it was held on the previous Thursday and Friday before returning to Monday and Tuesday in 1979. In 1990 the event was expanded to three days matches consisting of three foursomes and six singles.

Results

Source:

Earlier England–Scotland matches
Before the Girls Home Internationals was founded, an annual match had been played between England and Scotland since 1935. It was played immediately before the Girls Amateur Championship at the same venue.

The first match was held on Monday 2 September 1935 at Stoke Poges, before the Girls Amateur Championship. There were 7 singles matches, with Scotland winning 5 and England 2. Extra holes were played to ensure a result. Scotland won all four matches that were played before World War II. The match restarted in 1949 and was won first the first time by England. There were just 5 singles matches in 1949 and 1950 but the number returned to 7 from 1951. Foursomes matches were introduced in 1954, the match consisting of three foursomes and six singles. Only five singles matches were played in 1955 with seven played in 1959. In 1960 the match was extended to four foursomes and eight singles and resulted in a 6–6 tie. Extra holes were dropped from 1964. In 1965 the format returned to the earlier three foursomes and six singles, and resulted in a 4½–4½ tie. In 1966, at Troon Portland, Scotland won for the first time since 1938. In 1968 at Leven, the final match played before the start of the Home Internationals, resulted in the third tie in the match, 4½–4½.

Source:

Earlier Ireland–Wales matches
Ireland and Wales played their first girls international at Llandudno in August 1965, Wales winning 5–4. A second match was played on the Valley course at Royal Portrush in 1966, Ireland winning. In 1967 and 1968 the match was played on the same day as the England–Scotland match. Ireland won 7–2 in 1967 and 6½–2½ in 1968. The teams competed for the Swansea Spoon, later presented to the runners-up in the Home Internationals.

References

Team golf tournaments
Amateur golf tournaments
Golf in England
Golf in Ireland
Golf in Scotland
Golf in Wales
Recurring sporting events established in 1969
R&A championships
Recurring sporting events disestablished in 2020